Óscar Rodríguez Cabrera (born 4 December 1964) is a Mexican politician affiliated with the Institutional Revolutionary Party. He served as federal deputy of the LIX Legislature of the Mexican Congress as a plurinominal representative, and previously served as a local deputy in the Congress of Campeche.

References

1964 births
Living people
Politicians from Campeche City
Members of the Chamber of Deputies (Mexico)
Institutional Revolutionary Party politicians
Deputies of the LIX Legislature of Mexico
Members of the Congress of Campeche
National Autonomous University of Mexico alumni